was a waka poet and Japanese noblewoman active in the  Kamakura period.

Many of her poems appear in imperial poetry collections, including Shingoshūi Wakashū, Senzai Wakashū, Shokugosen Wakashū, Gyokuyō Wakashū, Shinsenzai Wakashū, Shinchokusen Wakashū, and others.

External links 
E-text of her poems in Japanese

Japanese poets
Japanese women poets
People of Kamakura-period Japan